The men's major golf championships, also known simply as the majors, are the four most prestigious events in professional golf. The competitions are the Masters Tournament, the U.S. Open, The Open Championship and the PGA Championship, contested annually.

Jack Nicklaus has won the most majors, achieving 18 victories during his career. Second on the list is Tiger Woods, who has won 15 majors to date; his most recent major victory was at the 2019 Masters. Walter Hagen is third with 11 majors; he and Nicklaus have both won the most PGA Championships with five. Nicklaus also holds the record for the most victories in the Masters, winning the tournament six times. Additionally, Nicklaus shares the record for the most U.S. Open victories with Willie Anderson, Bobby Jones and Ben Hogan, each winning four times. Harry Vardon holds the record for the most Open Championship victories, winning six times during his career. Five men: Nicklaus, Woods, Hogan, Gary Player and Gene Sarazen are the only golfers to have won all four of the majors during their career, thus achieving the career grand slam. Although the U.S. Amateur and The Amateur Championship were once considered to be majors, they are no longer recognized as such, and victories in these competitions are not included in the list.

To date, 462 majors have been played. A total of 230 different men have won majors and, of these, 84 have won at least two.

By golfer

By country

Gallery

See also
 Chronological list of men's major golf champions
 List of LPGA major championship winning golfers

References
General
 
 
 
 

Specific

Majors
 
Most wins
Major wins